Omar Fetmouche (born in Bordj Menaïel on 27 April 1955) is an Algerian artist, actor and playwright.

Early life
Fetmouche was born in 1955 in the town of Bordj Menaïel in lower Kabylia, and after having done his basic studies in his hometown.

He attended the University of Algiers where he obtained a license in French before he registered for a Magister's degree in French literature.

Career
Fetmouche began his artistic career with the creation in 1976 at Bordj Menaïel of the Menaïli theatrical movement within the framework of amateur theater.

Faced with the success of his theatrical troupe, he created in 1982 a popular drama school in Bordj Menaïel to channel the enthusiasm of young people towards the dramatic art.

The apotheosis of his artistic movement was crowned in 1990 when he created the artistic company "Sindjab" in his hometown.

His artistic success led him to be elected in 1998 as secretary general of the Algerian network of the International Institute of Mediterranean Theater.

In front of the proven professionalism of Fetmouche, he was appointed in August 2004 as head of the regional theater of Béjaïa at the level of the Anna Lindh Euro-Mediterranean Foundation for the Dialogue Between Cultures.

Fetmouche was a member of the jury for the 42nd edition of the National Amateur Theater Festival of Mostaganem held in June 2009.

He was part of an artistic commission called "Network-Passerelles" formed by academics and critics of the performing arts, and led open debates during the 47th National Amateur Theater Festival of Mostaganem organized in May 2014.

He was one of the members of the organizing committee of the 9th Arab Theater Festival which took place in January 2017 in Oran and Mostaganem.

Fetmouche participated with the Sinjab troupe in the 14th National Professional Theater Festival (FNTP) organized in March 2021 at the Algerian National Theater Mahieddine Bachtarzi (TNA) in Algiers.

Theatrical plays
During his artistic career, Fetmouche wrote several theatrical plays, including:

 Tahmouna (1977).
 Setta ou Damma (1982).
 Harf B’harf (1986).
 Hzam El Ghoula (1988).
 Rdjal Ya Hlalef (1989).
 D’miki y a Oueld d’Afrique (1989).
 Aouicha Ouel Heraz (1991).
 Allam El Baouche (1993).
 The wounded smile (1994).
 Yasmine (1996).
 Fatma N'Soumer (2004).
 Wouhouche.com (2006).
 Ayla Hamla (2006).
 Le Fleuve détourné (2007).
 Akher Saa (2009).
 Les vigiles (2009).
 Saha l’artiste (2019).
 Sinistri.
 Muhand u Chaavan.
 Uzzu n'Tayri.
 Timiqwa n'Tmuchuha.
 Akin Ilbhar.
 Urgagh Mmuthagh.
 The Alpine föhn.
 The unreason.
 Leonardo Fibonacci.
 The True Force.
 The Memorandum.

Awards
Fetmouche has been awarded for its artistic productions in several festivals:
 The first prize of the theater festival of Mostaganem in 1982.
 Prize for the best text for the play Wouhouche.com in 2005.

See also
List of Algerians
List of Algerian artists
List of Algerian writers

References

Bibliography

External links

 
 
 
 
 

1955 births
Living people
Algerian people
People from Bordj Menaïel
People from Bordj Menaïel District
People from Boumerdès Province
Kabyle people
University of Algiers alumni
Algerian actors
Algerian male stage actors
21st-century Algerian people